

157001–157100 

|-id=015
| 157015 Walterstraube ||  || Johann Walter Straube (born 1937), a founding father of astronomy in Namibia. || 
|-id=020
| 157020 Fertőszentmiklós ||  || Fertőszentmiklós is a small city in Győr-Moson-Sopron county, Hungary, and the birthplace of the second discoverer || 
|-id=064
| 157064 Sedona ||  || Sedona is a city located in northern Arizona, known mainly for scenic beauty of its red sandstone formations at the south end of the Oak Creek Canyon. || 
|}

157101–157200 

|-id=141
| 157141 Sopron ||  || The city of Sopron in Hungary, birthplace of astronomer Tamás Szalai who co-discovered this minor planet || 
|-id=194
| 157194 Saddlemyer ||  || Leslie K. Saddlemyer (born 1959), Canadian systems engineer at the Herzberg Institute of Astrophysics, National Research Council of Canada, project manager for the Gemini Planetary Imager || 
|}

157201–157300 

|-id=258
| 157258 Leach ||  || Sidney Leach (born 1951) and Gloria Leach (born 1958) have spread their enthusiasm for astronomy around young people for years in schools and public events || 
|-id=271
| 157271 Gurtovenko ||  || Ernest Andriyovych Gurtovenko (1928–1994), a Ukrainian astronomer and founder of the Kyiv school of the solar spectrography || 
|}

157301–157400 

|-
| 157301 Loreena ||  || Loreena McKennitt (born 1957), Canadian singer, composer and instrumentalist || 
|-id=332
| 157332 Lynette ||  || Donna Lynette Wells (born 1965), wife of the American astronomer Don J. Wells who discovered this minor planet || 
|-id=396
| 157396 Vansevicius ||  || Vladas Vansevicius (born 1958) is a professor at the Astronomical Observatory of Vilnius University and an expert in extragalactic astronomy, astrochemistry, galactic structure and multicolor photometry of stars and star clusters. He is an author of more than 120 scientific papers and many popular science articles. || 
|}

157401–157500 

|-id=421
| 157421 Carolpercy ||  || Carol Percy (born 1964), Canadian professor of English || 
|-id=456
| 157456 Pivatte ||  || "Pivatte" is the name of the house of the discoverer Michel Ory, located in Delémont, Switzerland, from where he made his first discovery using a remote telescope at Tenagra Observatory in the United States || 
|-id=473
| 157473 Emuno || 2005 QH || "Em Uno", Spanish spelling of "M1", a group of Spanish amateur astronomers || 
|-id=491
| 157491 Rüdigerkollar ||  || Rüdiger Kollar (1925–2005), German astronomer and founder of the discovering Radebeul Public Observatory || 
|-id=494
| 157494 Durham ||  || Steve Durham (born 1951) and his wife Marge (born 1948) have worked tirelessly to promote astronomy to people living in the Adirondack Mountains || 
|}

157501–157600 

|-id=533
| 157533 Stellamarie ||  || Stella Marie Ries (born 2008) is the niece of the discoverer Wolfgang Ries || 
|-id=534
| 157534 Siauliai ||  || The Lithuanian city of Siauliai || 
|-id=541
| 157541 Wachter ||  || Manfred Wachter (1938–2000) was a German telescope maker. He founded his company in 1963 in Stuttgart-Uhlbach and later moved to Bodelshausen. He was well known for his folded refractors with apertures of 100 mm to 230 mm, using lenses made by Dieter Lichtenknecker. || 
|}

157601–157700 

|-id=640
| 157640 Baumeler ||  || Martin Baumeler (born 1936), Swiss  artisan who helped with the Observatoire Robert-A. Naef, the discovery site || 
|-id=693
| 157693 Amandamarty || 2006 AB || Amanda Nicole Zawada (born 1987) and Martin Peter Mackinlay (born 1988) are geologists in Brisbane, Australia. || 
|}

157701–157800 

|-id=747
| 157747 Mandryka ||  || Nikita Mandryka (1940–2021), Tunisian-French cartoonist, creator of the Concombre masqué || 
|}

157801–157900 

|-bgcolor=#f2f2f2
| colspan=4 align=center | 
|}

157901–158000 

|-bgcolor=#f2f2f2
| colspan=4 align=center | 
|}

References 

157001-158000